Amsterdam Weekly (2004–2012) was a free English-language cultural paper from Amsterdam, published every Wednesday.

History and profile
Amsterdam Weekly offered mainly information about cultural topics and events like live concerts, theater, visual art, movies, and the gay and lesbian scene in and around Amsterdam. The paper used to be available at bookshops, cinemas, clubs, grocery stores, restaurants and bars and could also be downloaded as a PDF from the website.

Amsterdam Weekly was twice exhibited at the Design Museum in London, cited as one of 'the most inspiring design innovations to have been developed in Europe in the past two years', and was awarded six European Newspaper Awards.

Staff members included publisher Todd Savage, editor Steve Korver and arts editor Laura Martz.

References

2004 establishments in the Netherlands
Alternative weekly newspapers
Dutch-language newspapers
English-language newspapers published in Europe
Mass media in Amsterdam
Weekly newspapers published in the Netherlands
Newspapers established in 2004
Defunct newspapers published in the Netherlands
Publications disestablished in 2012
Defunct weekly newspapers